John Middleton (15 April 1910 – 3 August 1971) was an English footballer who made 179 appearances in the Football League playing for Swansea Town, Darlington, Blackpool and Norwich City in the 1920s and 1930s. An inside right, he also played non-league football for clubs including Mickley, Walker Celtic and South Shields.

References

1910 births
1971 deaths
People from Mickley, Northumberland
Footballers from Northumberland
English footballers
Association football inside forwards
Swansea City A.F.C. players
Walker Celtic F.C. players
Darlington F.C. players
Blackpool F.C. players
Norwich City F.C. players
South Shields F.C. (1936) players
English Football League players